Ruby Miller (14 July 1889 – 2 April 1976) was a British stage and film actress. Originally one of George Edwardes’ ‘Gaiety Girls’, she was the subject of TV's This is Your Life in 1962.

Selected filmography
 Little Women (1917)
 Edge O' Beyond (1919)
 The Mystery of Mr. Bernard Brown (1921)
 The Mystery Road (1921)
 Alimony (1924)
 The Infamous Lady (1928)
 Sorrell and Son (1933)
 The Dictator (1935)
 Gay Old Dog (1935)
 The Right Age to Marry (1935)
 Nothing Like Publicity (1936)
 Double Exposures (1937)
 Shadowed Eyes (1940)
 Law and Disorder (1940)
 Facing the Music (1941)
 The Hundred Pound Window (1944)
 Twilight Hour (1945)
 Anna Karenina (1948)

References

Bibliography
 Warren, Patricia. British Film Studios: An Illustrated History. Batsford, 2001.

External links

1889 births
1976 deaths
British stage actresses
British film actresses
Actresses from London
20th-century British actresses
20th-century English women
20th-century English people